Elizabeth Howard may refer to:
Elizabeth Boleyn, Countess of Wiltshire (c. 1480–1538), née Elizabeth Howard, mother of Anne Boleyn
Elizabeth Howard, Duchess of Norfolk (1497–1558), née Stafford, wife of Thomas Howard, 2nd Duke of Norfolk
Elizabeth Leyburne (1536–1567), wife of Thomas Howard, 4th Duke of Norfolk
Elizabeth Manners, Duchess of Rutland, born Elizabeth Howard
Elizabeth Howard (d. 1658), Countess of Banbury
Elizabeth Jane Howard (1923–2014), writer
Elizabeth Tilney, Countess of Surrey (died 1497), married name Elizabeth Howard
Elizabeth Howard, Countess of Effingham (died 1791)
Liz Howard, 27th president of the Camogie Association
Liz Howard (writer), Canadian writer
Elizabeth Howard, Tustin, CA Theater proprietor (retired 2005)

See also
Emily Elizabeth Howard, character